Andrew Walker (1855 – 10 July 1934) was a New Zealand politician of the United Labour Party and then the Labour Party from Dunedin.

Early life
Walker was born in North Berwick, Scotland in 1855. He came to New Zealand in 1860. He attended school in Dunedin's Union Street, where Robert Stout was one of his teachers. He left school aged 14 to learn the trade of printing at the Evening Star. He became a prominent union leader. Walker made a name for himself serving as the secretary of the Otago Typographical Union where he acted as a mentor to younger members such as Ken Baxter, leaving them with lasting commitments to the labour movement. He was also a Baptist dean and treasurer of Hanover Street Baptist Church.

Political career

He represented the Dunedin North electorate in Parliament from 1914 to 1919, when he was defeated by an Independent Labour candidate Edward Kellett. Walker was a protégé of Labour movement organizer Tom Paul, who did not contest a seat himself in the election, as he sat on the Legislative council, but must have felt vindicated after Walker's success.

In 1914 he won election, with Alfred Hindmarsh and Bill Veitch as the remnant of the United Labour Party, and in 1916 the remnant and the Social Democratic Party combined to form the Labour Party (NZLP).

Walker drew up the 1916 constitution and was the first secretary of the Labour Party caucus. He was the President of the NZLP but resigned in 1917 over the State Control issue, as he was a staunch prohibitionist. Between 1916 and 1919 he served as the Labour Party's whip.

Later life
Walker retired to Wellington where some of his family lived. For some years, he lived in Fairview Crescent in Kelburn. For his last two years, he lived at 13 Melling Road in Lower Hutt with his daughter and son-in-law. He died at the Lower Hutt residence on 10 July 1934. and was buried at Taita Cemetery. He was survived by his wife and two daughters; another daughter had died in 1919.

Notes

References

|-

1855 births
1934 deaths
New Zealand Labour Party MPs
United Labour Party (New Zealand) MPs
New Zealand MPs for Dunedin electorates
Members of the New Zealand House of Representatives
New Zealand Baptists
New Zealand temperance activists
People from North Berwick
Scottish emigrants to New Zealand
Unsuccessful candidates in the 1919 New Zealand general election
Burials at Taitā Lawn Cemetery